The 2016 Chengdu Challenger was a professional tennis tournament played on hard courts. It was the 1st edition of the tournament which was part of the 2016 ATP Challenger Tour. It took place in Chengdu, China between 1 and 7 August 2016.

Singles main-draw entrants

Seeds

 1 Rankings are as of July 25, 2016.

Other entrants
The following players received wildcards into the singles main draw:
  Te Rigele
  Ouyang Bowen
  He Yecong
  Janko Tipsarević

The following player received entry into the singles main draw with a protected ranking:
  Karunuday Singh

The following players received entry from the qualifying draw:
  Sun Fajing
  Takuto Niki
  Yuya Kibi
  Evgeny Karlovskiy

Champions

Singles

  Jason Jung def.  Rubén Ramírez Hidalgo, 6–4, 6–2

Doubles

  Gong Maoxin /  Zhang Ze def.  Gao Xin /  Li Zhe, 6–3, 4–6, [13–11]

References

Chengdu Challenger
2016
Chengdu Challenger
Chengdu Challenger